The Viking Symbol Mystery is Volume 42 in the original The Hardy Boys Mystery Stories published by Grosset & Dunlap.

This book was written for the Stratemeyer Syndicate by Alistair M. Hunter in 1963.

Plot summary
The Hardy Boys and Chet Morton travel to Canada's Northwest Territories to recover a stolen Viking artifact (a runestone). They also smash a group of thieves robbing recreational lodges around the Great Slave Lake. They visit Saskatoon, Saskatchewan; Edmonton, Alberta; Fort Smith, Northwest Territories; Wood Buffalo National Park; and Hay River.

References

The Hardy Boys books
1963 American novels
1963 children's books
Novels set in the Northwest Territories
Grosset & Dunlap books